Ibrahim Cissé (born 2 May 1996) is a French professional footballer who plays as a defender for Ligue 2 club Caen.

Club career

Tours
Born in Paris, Cissé began his career at Tours. He made his professional debut on 6 October 2014 in a Ligue 2 match against Brest. He started the game and played the full 90 minutes in a 2–0 away loss.

Angers
On 12 July 2018, Cissé signed with Ligue 1 side Angers.

Caen
On 1 September 2021, he joined Caen on a two-year contract.

Personal life
Cissé was born in France and is of Senegalese descent.

Career statistics

References

External links
 
 
 
 
 
 Ibrahim Cissé at foot-national.com

1996 births
Living people
Footballers from Paris
French footballers
French sportspeople of Senegalese descent
Association football defenders
Tours FC players
Angers SCO players
Paris FC players
USL Dunkerque players
Stade Malherbe Caen players
Ligue 2 players
Ligue 1 players